Gautam Bambawale (born 2 November 1958) is an Indian diplomat and served as the Indian Ambassador to China from 2017 to 2018. He had previously served as the Indian High Commissioner to Pakistan.

Personal life
Gautam was born to Hemant and Usha Bambawale. He grew up in Pune and studied at the Bishop's School and the Fergusson College. He obtained a Master's Degree in Economics from the Gokhale Institute of Politics and Economics. Bambawale's father is a physician while his mother has been a prominent social activist from Pune. In his youth, Gautam played badminton and captained the Fergusson College Cricket Team too. He speaks Mandarin Chinese and German fluently.

He married Amita Sathe. Amita has authored a book, "Dinner Décor: A How-to Guide for Fabulous Centerpieces".

Gautam and Amita have two sons: Harshavardhan and Vikram.

Career
Bambawale joined the Indian Foreign Service in August 1984. He studied Mandarin Chinese and served in the Indian missions at Hong Kong and Beijing from 1985 to 1991. Upon his return to the Ministry of External Affairs in New Delhi, he served as the first Desk Officer for China in the Ministry. From 1993 to 1994, Bambawale was the Director in the Americas Division of the Ministry.

From 1994 to 1998, he was the Director of the Indian Cultural Centre in Berlin where he dealt with Public diplomacy. From March 2001 to June 2002, he worked at the Ministry of External Affairs in New Delhi as the Staff Officer to the Foreign Secretary of India. Subsequently, he functioned at the Prime Minister's Office in New Delhi as the Deputy Chief in the Division of National Security Affairs, Defence and International Policy.

Bambawale was the Minister (Political) and Head of the Political Wing at the Indian Embassy in Washington, D.C. from July to September 2007. From September 2007 to December 2009, he served as India's first Consul General in Guangzhou. From December 2009 to July 2014, he was the Joint Secretary (East Asia) at the Ministry of External Affairs in New Delhi.

He also served as the Indian Ambassador to Bhutan from August 2014 to December 2015 and the High Commissioner of India to Pakistan from January 2016 to November 2017. 

Bambawale is considered as an expert on China.

He joined Ola Cabs in 2020, as a senior adviser for corporate and international affairs.

References

 Living people
 1958 births
Ambassadors of India to Bhutan
Indian Foreign Service officers
Ambassadors of India to China
High Commissioners of India to Pakistan
People from Pune